Amin Khan may refer to:

 Amin Khan (governor), Governor of Bengal in 1272
 Amin Ullah Khan, Pakistani politician
 Amin Khan (actor) (born 1977), Bangladeshi actor